The Shirin Tagab River is a river in Afghanistan, and travels  before ending in an inland delta around Andkhoi. The river's watershed has 504 settlements with a population of 605972, and covers the majority of Faryab Province. Downstream, the river is brackish/saltwater. In addition, the river is a source of water-borne diseases.

Course
The river begins flowing west in the eastern part of Bilchiragh District, and is joined by the river Chashma-i Khwab near the district center, after the Chashma has flowed through scenic rapids. The Tagab then turns north, flowing through the northeast corner of Pashtun Kot District and western Khwaja Sabz Posh District. As it enters Shirin Tagab District, the river is joined by the Astana river. At Araba, an irrigation canal takes the majority of the river's water. Then, near Pata Baba in Dawlat Abad District, it is joined by the Shor Darya River, which carries the water from the Almar, Qaysar, and  Maimana rivers. The Shirin Tagab then dissipates around the city of Andkhoy, on the edge of the Dasht-i Shortepa.

The river used to run to the Amu Darya before the development of irrigation and the diversion of water.

Economy
Most of the river's water is used for irrigation. Sometimes, the large amount of water being diverted leaves the natural waterway nearly dry; little water reaches Andkhoy in the summer months.

About  of its watershed is cultivated, and another 6,000 serving as rangeland.

References

External links
Astana River Valley Study
Streamflow Characteristics at Streamgages in Northern Afghanistan and Selected Locations
Map of Watersheds in Afghanistan

Rivers of Afghanistan
Landforms of Faryab Province